Heilig Geist (Holy Spirit) is the name of a Catholic church in the suburb Riederwald of Frankfurt am Main, Hesse, Germany. The parish church of the Riederwald congregation is part of the Roman Catholic Diocese of Limburg. On 1 January 2015 the parish became a Kirchort (church location), part of the parish St. Josef, Frankfurt.

Logos

History 
In 1923, the parish bought a property to build a church, designed by Martin Weber on a commissioned by minister Georg Heinrich Hörle. Groundbraking was on 13 July 1930. It was dedicated by Bishop Antonius Hilfrich on 20 September 1931.

The church was severely damaged during World War II. It was restored after the war. Wilhelm Kempf, later Bishop of Limburg, was parish priest of the congregation from 1942 to 1949. From 1991, Peter Reulein was the church musician, who moved then to the  Liebfrauen in the centre of Frankfurt.

On 1 January 2015, four parishes were combined to St. Josef, with locations (Kirchort) , Maria Rosenkranz, Heilig Geist and Herz Jesu.

Building 

The church was designed intentionally modest, different from more monumental works by Weber such as Heilig Kreuz in Bornheim. The church is connected to the minister's house.

Literature

References

External links 

 St. Josef Frankfurt

Roman Catholic churches in Frankfurt
Churches in the Diocese of Limburg